Bandhu is a Hindi-language action drama film directed by Ugyen Chopel and produced by Romesh Sharma. This film was released on 29 August 1992 under the banner of NH Studioz. Bandhu is the Hindi remake of 1987 Nepali film Saino directed by the same director.

Plot
Dipak leaves Bombay to stay in a hill station with his wife Nita and their only child Binu. A Local evil landlord, Ajit Bihari, tries to capture Dipak's land. After few days, Dipak dies in a road accident. One night Bihari intrudes into Dipak's house and tries to rape a helpless Nita. Suddenly a stranger enters the house and saves her. Nita's son Binu calls him Bandhu (Friend). A friendly relationship forms between them, and the stranger lives with them. A local older woman advises the stranger to marry Nita. But police come to arrest the stranger for killing Dipak.

Cast
 Danny Denzongpa as Bandhu 
 Abhishek as Dipak 
Geetanjali as Nita
Sunil Thapa as Police Inspector (special appearance)
 Farida Jalal as Old Woman
 Deb Mukherjee as Ajit Bihari
 Archana Puran Singh as Bandhu's wife
Tapas Paul as a special appearance
 Joya Mathur
 Tarun Ghosh

Music
Ranjit Gazmer composed all the songs while Kiran Mishra wrote them.

"Chalo Chale Saathiyan" - Kumar Sanu, Asha Bhosle
"Mausi Oh Mausi" - Sudesh Bhosle, Jolly Mukherjee, Anupama Deshpande
"Kaun Ho Mere Tum" - Danny Denzongpa, Asha Bhosle
"Ek Jyoti Chita Se Jalakar" - Asha Bhosle

References

External links
 

1992 films
Films shot in Sikkim
Hindi films remade in other languages
Indian action drama films
1990s Hindi-language films
1990s action drama films
Indian remakes of foreign films
1992 drama films
Films scored by Ranjit Gazmer